Phyllodoce caerulea, known as blue heath in British English and purple mountain heather or blue mountainheath in American English, is an evergreen species of dwarf shrub that grows up to around  tall, and bears clusters of 2–6 purple flowers. It is native to boreal regions around the Northern Hemisphere, but with large gaps in its distribution.

Description

These are surrounded by five sepals, and themselves surround the 8–10 free stamens and a superior ovary that produces nectar at its base.

Distribution
Phyllodoce caerulea has a patchy circumboreal distribution, with gaps between 110° W and 155° W and between 70° E and 125° E.

In Europe, P. caerulea is found from Iceland to the Kanin Peninsula. Its Icelandic distribution is also disjunct, comprising the area around Eyjafjörður and a site near Desjarmyri. In the British Isles, P. caerulea is confined to a few sites in the Scottish Highlands. It became a protected species in the UK in 1975 under the Conservation of Wild Creatures and Wild Plants Act. There are reports of the plant's occurrence in the Swiss Alps, but no herbarium specimens have been found to confirm this. The species has not been observed on the Faroe Islands, Jan Mayen, Bjørnøya, Svalbard or Franz Josef Land.

In Asia, Phyllodoce caerulea occurs in the Ural Mountains, around Lake Baikal and in the Mongolian Khangai and Kentii mountains, but is absent from most of central Siberia. It occurs on Hokkaido, Sakhalin, the Kamchatka Peninsula and in Beringia.

In North America, P. caerulea is found in coastal Alaska, the Northwest Territories, Quebec and Labrador, as well as scattered sites in the Gaspé Peninsula and the White Mountains of New Hampshire and Vermont. It is widespread and common in Greenland. Its absence from the Yukon has been described as "surprising".

Taxonomy
Phyllodoce caerulea was first described by Carl Linnaeus in his 1753 , as a species in the genus Andromeda. It was transferred to the genus Phyllodoce by Cardale Babington in his 1843 Manual of British Botany. In Japan, P. caerulea hybridises with the pale yellowish-flowering species P. aleutica to produce F1 offspring with flowers that are pink, orange or striped in pink and yellowish white.

References

Further reading

External links

Flora of the Arctic
Ericoideae
Flora of Europe
Flora of Korea
Flora of North America
Flora of temperate Asia
Plants described in 1753
Taxa named by Carl Linnaeus